This article lists the main weightlifting events and their results for 2015.

IWF Grand Prix
 September 21 – 23: 2015 IWF Grand Prix (Rio 2016 Olympic Qualifying Event) in  Fuzhou
  won both the gold and overall medal tallies in both men's and women's events.
 December 12 & 13: 2015 IWF Grand Prix (5th Russian Federation President's Cup) in  Grozny
 Men:  and  won 4 gold and 9 overall medals each.
 Women:  and the  won 3 gold medals each.  won all six silver medals in the event.

World weightlifting championships
 April 7 – 12: 2015 IWF Youth World Weightlifting Championships in  Lima

  won both the gold and overall medal tallies.
 June 6 – 14: 2015 IWF Junior World Weightlifting Championships in  Wrocław

  won both the gold and overall medal tallies.
 November 20 – 29: 2015 World Weightlifting Championships in  Houston
  won both the gold and overall medal tallies in Big and Small categories.

Continental weightlifting championships
 January 1 – 7: 2015 Asian Youth and Junior Weightlifting Championships in  Doha

 Junior:  won both the gold and overall medal tallies.

 Youth:  won both the gold and overall medal tallies.
 April 9 – 18: 2015 European Weightlifting Championships in  Tbilisi

  won the gold medal tally.  won the overall medal tally.
 May 5 – 10: 2015 Pan American Junior Weightlifting Championships in  Cartagena

 Junior Men: Host nation, won both the gold and overall medal tallies.

 Junior Women: The  won the gold medal tally.  won the overall medal tally.
 August 1 – 9: 2015 European Youth Weightlifting Championships in  Landskrona
 Men's U15:  won the gold medal tally.  won the overall medal tally.
 Women's U15:  won both the gold and overall medal tallies.
 Men's U17:  won both the gold and overall medal tallies.
 Women's U17:  won the gold medal tally.  won the overall medal tally.
 September 3 – 12: 2015 Asian Weightlifting Championships in  Phuket
 Note: This event was scheduled to be held in Kathmandu in July. However, it was moved from there following the April 2015 Nepal earthquake.
  won the big and small rankings (gold and overall medal tallies).
 September 15 – 20: 2015 Pan American Youth Weightlifting Championships in  San Luis Potosí
 Youth Men:  won the gold medal tally.  won the overall medal tally.
 Youth Women:  won both the gold and overall medal tallies.
 October 2 – 11: 2015 European Junior and U23 Weightlifting Championships in  Klaipėda
  won both the gold and overall medal tallies.
 Men's Junior Team winners: 
 Men's U23 Team winners: 
 Women's Junior Team winners: 
 Women's U23 Team winners: 
 October 11 – 16: 2015 Commonwealth Weightlifting Championships in  Pune
 Youth:  won both the gold and overall medal tallies.
 Junior:  won both the gold and overall medal tallies.
 Senior:  won both the gold and overall medal tallies.

IPC Powerlifting Regional Championships
 April 25 – 29: 2015 IPC Powerlifting Americas Open Championships in  Mexico City

 Host nation, won the gold medal tally.  won the overall medal tally.
 July 26 – 30: 2015 IPC Powerlifting Asian Open Championships in  Almaty
  won both the gold and overall medal tallies.
 November 24 – 28: 2015 IPC Powerlifting European Open Championships in  Eger
  won both the gold and overall medal tallies.

References

External links
 International Weightlifting Federation Website

 
Weightlifting by year
2015 in sports